Orange Township, Ohio may refer to:

Orange Township, Ashland County, Ohio
Orange Township, Carroll County, Ohio
Orange Township, Delaware County, Ohio
Orange Township, Hancock County, Ohio
Orange Township, Meigs County, Ohio
Orange Township, Shelby County, Ohio

See also 
 Orange, Ohio (disambiguation)

Ohio township disambiguation pages